is a Japanese animation studio located in Koganei, Tokyo, Japan. It was established on January 23, 1998 by former J.C.Staff producer Tomoko Kawasaki and is known for doing the animation production of series such as Sister Princess and Diabolik Lovers. Zexcs is also known for its work in cooperation with its sister company Feel.

Productions

Television series

Original video animations

Films

References

External links
Official website 

 
Japanese animation studios
Mass media companies established in 1998
Japanese companies established in 1998
Animation studios in Tokyo
Koganei, Tokyo